The French 9th Motorized Division was a French Army division active during World War II.

World War 2

Battle Of France
During the Battle of France in May 1940, the division contained the following units:
13th Infantry Regiment
95th Infantry Regiment
131st Infantry Regiment
2nd Reconnaissance Battalion
30th Artillery Regiment
230th Artillery Regiment

The division was an active division which had existed during peacetime. It was a fully motorized infantry division.

9